Entresierras is a subcomarca of Guijuelo in the province of Salamanca, Castile and León, Spain.  It contains the municipalities of Casafranca, Endrinal, Frades de la Sierra, Herguijuela, La Sierpe, Los Santos, Membribe de la Sierra and Monleón.

References 

Province of Salamanca
Comarcas of the Province of Salamanca